This is a list of monuments and sites that are classified or inventoried by the Moroccan ministry of culture around Figuig.

Monuments and sites in Figuig 

|}

References 

Figuig
Figuig Province